Wierzbica  is a village in the administrative district of Gmina Dąbrówno, within Ostróda County, Warmian-Masurian Voivodeship, in northern Poland.

The village has a population of 360.

References

Wierzbica